Bonham High School is a public high school located in Bonham, Texas, United States and classified as a 3A school by the University Interscholastic League (UIL). It is part of the Bonham Independent School District which encompasses central Fannin County. In 2015, the school was rated "Met Standard" by the Texas Education Agency.

Athletics
The Bonham Purple Warriors compete in these sports - 

Volleyball, Cross Country, Football, Basketball, Powerlifting, Soccer, Tennis, Golf, Track, Baseball & Softball, Robotics

State titles
Boys Track - 
1978(3A)
Girls Track - 
1989(3A)

Notable alumni
Danny Darwin, former Major League Baseball pitcher (1978–98)
Roy McMillan, former Major League Baseball player and manager (1951-1975)

References

External links
 

Schools in Fannin County, Texas
Public high schools in Texas